Ferraz is a surname. Notable people with the surname include:

Afonso Ferraz (born 1964), Angolan sprinter
Antonio Ferraz (born 1929), Spanish road racing cyclist
Artur Ivens Ferraz (1870–1933), Portuguese military officer and politician
Bruna Ferraz (born 1981), Brazilian adult model, pornographic actress and television personality
Carolina Ferraz (born 1968), Brazilian actress, television presenter and former model
Esther Figueiredo Ferraz (1916–2008), Brazilian politician
Filipe Ferraz (born 1980), Brazilian volleyball player
Gastão de Freitas Ferraz, Portuguese spy
Guilherme Ivens Ferraz (1865–1956), Portuguese Navy officer
J. A. Beleza Ferraz (1901−?), Portuguese military personnel
Joaquim Ferraz (born 1974), Portuguese footballer
Jose Ferraz (born 1949), Portuguese football player and manager
Jurema Ferraz (born 1985), Angolan model and beauty pageant titleholder 
Kiros Stanlley Soares Ferraz (born 1988), Brazilian football
Lucas Ferraz Vila (born 1998), Argentine footballer 
Luís Ferraz (born 1987), Portuguese footballer
Luís Antônio de Carvalho Ferraz (1940–1982), Brazilian Navy officer
Matheus Ferraz (born 1985), Brazilian footballer 
Salomão Barbosa Ferraz (1880–1969), Brazilian priest and bishop
Sílvio Ferraz (born 1959), Brazilian composer
Tercio Sampaio Ferraz Jr., Brazilian jurist and author
Valentín Ferraz y Barrau (1792–1866), Spanish military commander and politician
Walter Ferraz de Negreiros (born 1946), Brazilian retired footballer

See also
Ferraz de Vasconcelos